Luciana González Costa (born 29 November 1976, in Buenos Aires) is an Argentine actress.

Filmography

Films

TV series

References

External links
Luciana González Costa on Red Teatral 
Luciana González Costa on Cine Nacional 

1976 births
Argentine stage actresses
Argentine film actresses
Argentine television actresses
Argentine people of Spanish descent
Living people